The British LGBT Awards are a British award show that aim to "recognise individuals and organizations that display outstanding commitment to the LGBT community".

The awards were founded in 2014 by Sarah Garrett MBE. LGBT celebrities and straight allies are among the people that are recognised at the ceremony, held annually at the London Marriott Hotel County Hall in Westminster.

2015
The inaugural LGBT Awards were held on 24 April 2015.

2016
The 2016 awards were held on 13 May 2016.

2017
The 2017 awards were held on 12 May 2017.

2018
The 2018 ceremony was held on 11 May 2018.

2019
The 2019 ceremony was held on 17 May 2019.

2020
In 2020, the awards were delayed due to COVID-19 pandemic. Ultimately the ceremony were held virtually on 27 November 2020.

2021
In 2021, the awards returned to an in-person ceremony and were held on 27 August 2021.

References

External links
Official site

British awards
LGBT events in the United Kingdom